Guillermo "Willy" Toledo Monsalve (born 22 May 1970) is a Spanish actor and producer. Besides his stage career he is also noted as polemicist and for his political activism.

Biography 
Guillermo Toledo Monsalve was born in Madrid on 22 May 1970, to a well-off family, son of a prestigious surgeon pioneer in thoracic surgery. He studied at the Colegio Estilo in El Viso. He trained as actor in Spain and the United States.

Together with Alberto San Juan, Nathalie Poza and Ernesto Alterio, Toledo founded in 1996 the theatrical group Ración de oreja, which presented the theatrical staging Animalario. Ración de oreja later merged with Andrés Lima's Riesgo to create the theatre company , named after Ración de oreja'''s debut work.

His breakout role came in 1999 with his performance as 'Richard' in the television series 7 Vidas from 1999 to 2002.

His performance in the 2002 musical film El otro lado de la cama earned him a nomination to the Goya Award for Best New Actor, whereas his performance in Álex de la Iglesia's Crimen ferpecto (2004) earned him a nomination to the Goya Award for Best Actor.

After years of an alleged "veto" of the Spanish film and TV industry on granting roles to Toledo, Toledo returned to fiction in the Netflix's series The Minions of Midas'', premiered in November 2019.

Activism 
He was noted for his activism in Spain against the Iraq War and for his support to the Sahrawi liberation movement. Distinguished as deliverer of controversial statements and for the "disrespectful" way of defending them, he has also voiced himself in favour of the Cuban regime, against the Spanish monarchy, against Podemos and against La Sexta.

He was released and the case against him was closed.

In November 2020, he was acquitted after being tried for blasphemy by the Catholic far-right lobby Abogados Cristianos, after writing a Facebook post "shitting on god and the virgin" as way of criticising the opening of oral proceedings against three women who in 2014 paraded a large vagina in Seville under the banner "The Unsubmissive Pussy".

Filmography

Film

References

External links
 

1970 births
Living people
Spanish male film actors
Spanish male television actors
Male actors from Madrid
20th-century Spanish male actors
21st-century Spanish male actors
Anti–Iraq War activists
Spanish male stage actors